Chris Pella (born 1943) is an American former college football coach and player. He served as the head football coach at Utah State University from 1983 to 1985 compiling a record of 9–24.

Coaching career
Pella attended Box Elder High School in Brigham City, Utah. He began his college football career at Dixie Junior College, where he was team captain and an All-American. He then transferred to Utah State University, where he played as a fullback, offensive lineman, and kicker at various points. After graduation, Pella was retained as an assistant coach. He served in this capacity for four years before taking a position with the United States Navy as athletic director for the Yokosuka Naval Arsenal. He returned to Utah State in 1972, where he worked as an assistant under Bruce Snyder until his promotion to head coach in 1983. He was released from his duties at  Utah State in 1985 after three losing seasons.

Following his dismissal from his alma mater, Pella was hired by LaVell Edwards to work on the football staff at Brigham Young University (BYU). From 1986 to 2000, he coached tight ends and served as chief recruiting coordinator. He continued to scout for the program until his retirement in 2003.

Head coaching record

References

1943 births
Living people
American football fullbacks
American football placekickers
BYU Cougars football coaches
Utah Tech Trailblazers football players
Utah State Aggies football coaches
Utah State Aggies football players
Junior college football players in the United States
People from Brigham City, Utah
Players of American football from Utah